The Samsung Digimax A6 was a digital camera produced by Samsung Techwin. It featured a 6-megapixel CCD, 12x zoom (3x optical and 4x digital), 4 cm macro, voice recording and 30 frame/s MJPEG video recording. It was succeeded by the Samsung Digimax A7.

External links

 Digimax A6 details

Digimax A6